Fandango is a 1985 American comedy film directed by Kevin Reynolds. It was originally a student film titled Proof made by Reynolds while he was attending USC film school. It was a parody of Greek life at his alma mater Baylor University. However, due to his father's presidency at Baylor, he did not wish to portray the Baptist institution in an unfavorable light and gave it the alternative distinction as the University of Texas.  The film is now a cult classic.

Steven Spielberg saw the film and helped fund a feature-length comedy/drama about five college students from Texas in 1971 who go on a "last road trip" together, celebrating the "privilege of youth" as they face graduation, marriage and the draft for the Vietnam War.

Fandango stars Kevin Costner (in his first starring role, although an earlier film where he had been the lead actor, The Gunrunner had actually wrapped in 1983 but was not released until 1989), Judd Nelson and Sam Robards. The soundtrack features an original score by Alan Silvestri and music by Pat Metheny and Lyle Mays, among others. 

The film was released by Warner Bros. and Amblin Entertainment on January 25, 1985, and a DVD of the film was released on February 15, 2005. Fandango marked not only the directorial debut of Reynolds but also the feature film debut of Suzy Amis, previously known primarily for her work in modeling.

Plot
In 1971, at a fraternity house on the University of Texas campus in Austin, Texas, Gardner Barnes is throwing darts at a picture of himself and his ex-girlfriend Debbie. He rejoins the graduation party going on downstairs, but not before tearing the picture in half. Gardner is a member of a clique called the Groovers, whose other members include Kenneth Waggener, engaged to be married, and ROTC geek Phil Hicks. Phil's parents arrive at the fraternity house just in time to see another Groover named Lester pass out (and remain unconscious for most of the film). They also meet the strong, quiet seminary student Dorman.

Kenneth interrupts the festivities by announcing his student deferment has expired and he is now to be drafted into the Vietnam War. Gardner is not surprised: his own notice came weeks before. Kenneth also reveals he has decided to call off his engagement to Debbie on account of being drafted. Gardner reacts with some joy and relief. The Groovers decide to celebrate their last days before the draft by going on a road trip, intending to visit a notorious roadhouse, then "dig up" someone - or something - named Dom near the Rio Grande. They drive all night before making a rest stop. Some, including Phil, resist continuing, but Gardner presses them on.

Phil's car runs out of gas and the Groovers must decide whether to walk to the nearest town or hitch. Phil is adamant about not leaving his car behind, when someone gets the idea to lasso a train passing on the railroad track parallel to the road. Dorman successfully attaches the front bumper with some fence cable to the back of the train, but the car's front end is pulled off, leaving the car in place. The Groovers push the car to a garage in the nearest town and eat at a Sonic Drive-In. They meet up with some townie girls and eventually end up playing in a cemetery operated by one of the girls' undertaker father, where they come upon a fallen Vietnam War soldier's tombstone. They sleep at the former movie set of Giant.

The next morning, with the car repaired with a front end from a different make and model, the Groovers continue. Phil wants to go back, prompting Kenneth to shout angrily at him. Gardner confesses they only let Phil hang with them because they felt sorry for him. Humiliated, Phil retorts that he will take on any challenge. The group sees a sign for a parachute school giving jumping lessons. Gardner cons the hippie-ish instructor Truman Sparks into giving Phil a free lesson. Phil is terrified but goes up into Truman's aircraft. However, he is carrying Truman's dirty laundry instead of a parachute. The boys try desperately to warn him from the ground without success. Fortunately, Phil is able to open the emergency chute on his stomach with much prompting from Truman by walkie-talkie. The Groovers get a picture for their efforts; Phil gets some of his wounded pride back.

After discovering the charred, abandoned remains of the roadhouse, the Groovers press onward. At last they reach a bluff overlooking the Rio Grande and dig up Dom – which turns out to be a magnum of Dom Pérignon champagne. Each takes a drink before Gardner toasts to "freedom and youth." Kenneth is disheartened, having second thoughts about calling off the engagement. Pondering on the nature of love, Gardner decides to make things right. He calls Debbie, gets her to re-accept the engagement, and arranges for Truman Sparks to fly her from Dallas to the border town and back. Through some trickery, reminiscent of stone soup, he sets up a beautiful wedding for Kenneth and Debbie. Debbie and Gardner share one last dance after the wedding.

After the ceremony, Phil gives Kenneth and Debbie his car as a wedding present. Lester goes to hitch a ride "anywhere" and Phil and Dorman shake hands before leaving. Perched atop a cliff overlooking the town and watching the wedding reception, Gardner lifts a beer in salute to his friends.

Cast

 Kevin Costner as Gardner Barnes
 Judd Nelson as Phil Hicks
 Sam Robards as Kenneth Waggener
 Chuck Bush as Dorman
 E. G. Daily as Judy
 Brian Cesak as Lester Griffin
 Marvin J. McIntyre as Truman Sparks
 Suzy Amis as Debbie
 Glenne Headly as Trelis
 Stanley Grover as Phil's Dad
 Jane A. Johnston as Phil's Mom
 Marco Perella as Jester
 Pepe Serna as Gas Station Mechanic

Production

Principal photography began in the spring of 1983 at a number of locations, primarily in Texas, including Alpine, Austin, El Paso, Fort Davis, Lajitas, Marathon, Marfa, Monahans, Pyote, Pecos, and San Elizario. Big Bend Ranch State Park in Texas (where Dom was located) and Tulsa, Oklahoma, were also prominent in the film.

The skydiving sequence in Fandango is shot-for-shot taken from Kevin Reynolds's USC thesis film, Proof from 1980. Spielberg had seen a copy of Proof and offered to produce the project, which became Fandango, through his company, Amblin Entertainment.

The supposed backdrop of downtown Dallas where Truman Sparks flies to is actually Tulsa, Oklahoma, in 1984. The aerial sequence was filmed with the assistance of the Commemorative Air Force (then known as the Confederate Air Force), which has its main headquarters in Texas. The screen credits note: "Special thanks to the Confederate Air Force for their assistance in making this motion picture."

Release 
Warner Bros. delayed the release of the film reportedly because the then-unknown cast made the movie "unreleasable". After viewing a completed cut of the film, Reynolds also noted script problems, and in March 1984 he was allowed a four-day reshoot. 

The film was finally released by Warner Bros. in a limited release in New York City and Los Angeles on January 25, 1985. It earned a reported a $50,437 gross from twenty-seven theaters, and ultimately grossed less than US$100,000. 

Spielberg was said to be disappointed with the finished film, though Amblin Entertainment is still credited as the production company. Spielberg admitted that the film "wasn't really released," but wouldn't say more than that. Asked to comment on Spielberg's hesitance to release the film, director Kevin Reynolds' agent simply responded: "He's tired of talking about Steven Spielberg, and he's busy."

Reception
In her review of Fandango for The New York Times, Janet Maslin praised Kevin Reynolds' "way with the sight gags and off-the-wall humor that make this a notable debut. And he brings a good deal of feeling to the moments in which the film's twin specters – Vietnam and maturity – intrude upon the frantic festivities." The Globe and Mail also praised the direction: "Reynolds shows an uncanny confidence with the camera, a sureness which is backed up by a powerful visual sensitivity and an ear for language, especially the vernacular of Texas, where the film is set."

Leonard Maltin called Fandango "fresh and likeable, if uneven." Quentin Tarantino reportedly described Fandango as "one of the best directorial debuts" in the history of cinema, and is quoted as saying, "I saw Fandango five times at the movie theatre and it only played for a fucking week, all right?"

Legacy 
Modern reappraisals have focused on the storytelling and character development. Reviewer Bryan Pope critiqued the DVD version as, "Breezy and confident, and with a wing dinger of a soundtrack, Fandango is the definition of a sleeper. Before the final credits roll, its characters will have downed a few beers, faced fears, forged new friendships, tested old ones, and searched with some success for the answers to life's important questions. And, yes, one of them will even have danced the fandango under the Texas sky."

Fandango grew in popularity through television and home video, and in July 2010, fans held a 25th anniversary celebration at the filming locations.

Reynolds and Costner would later go on to work together on two more films, Robin Hood: Prince of Thieves (1991) and Waterworld (1995). Reynolds was Costner's uncredited second unit director and set advisor for the western epic and Costner directorial debut Dances with Wolves (1990). Reynolds and Costner collaborated once again on the History Channel mini-series Hatfields & McCoys (2012).

References
Notes

Citations

Bibliography

External links
 
 
 
 
 
Fandango at Apple TV

1985 films
American aviation films
1985 comedy films
Amblin Entertainment films
Films about fraternities and sororities
Films set in Texas
Films set in 1971
Films shot in Texas
American comedy road movies
American buddy comedy-drama films
1980s comedy road movies
1980s buddy comedy-drama films
Warner Bros. films
Films directed by Kevin Reynolds
Skydiving in fiction
Films scored by Alan Silvestri
Features based on short films
1985 directorial debut films
Films produced by Tim Zinnemann
1980s English-language films
1980s American films